Kucheger (Khüshegeer) is a rural locality (an ulus) in Kurumkansky District, Republic of Buryatia, Russia. The population was 48 as of 2010.

Geography 
Kucheger is located 86 km northeast of Kurumkan (the district's administrative centre) by road. Ulyunkhan is the nearest rural locality.

References 

Rural localities in Kurumkansky District